Amy Hudson (born 5 February 1916 in Sydney, Australia - died 7 June 2003) was an Australian cricket player. She played in nine test matches for the Australia national women's cricket team.  Hudson was the 15th woman to play test cricket for the Australia national women's cricket team.

References

1916 births
2003 deaths
Australia women Test cricketers